Redstone Federal Credit Union (or RFCU) is a federally chartered credit union based in Huntsville, Alabama. Redstone Federal Credit Union is currently Alabama's largest credit union, and is regulated and insured through the National Credit Union Administration (NCUA). Redstone Federal Credit Union currently operates 26 branches across Alabama and Tennessee as of December 2021. Redstone Federal Credit Union is currently ranked as the 35th largest credit union in the United States by assets as of December 2021.

History
Redstone Federal Credit Union opened on November 28, 1951, in order to serve employees of the Redstone Arsenal. The credit union's initial membership consisted of eleven individuals with assets totaling $55. Membership eligibility has now expanded to include over 1,500 clubs, organizations, and employers.

In 2018, Redstone Federal Credit Union was recognized as the Credit Union of the Year by the National Association of Federally-Insured Credit Unions.

Services
Products and services offered by Redstone Federal Credit Union include savings and checking accounts, small business financing and cash management solutions, and investment and insurance services. The credit union also contains a real estate department which offers mortgage products and home equity loans. Redstone Federal Credit Union members also have access to over 75,000 ATMs located throughout the United States.

References

External links
 Official website
 Info about the history of the credit union

Credit unions based in Alabama
Banks established in 1951
Companies based in Huntsville, Alabama
1951 establishments in Alabama
Financial services companies of the United States
Financial services in the United States
Credit unions
Banks of the United States